Roizman is a surname. Notable people with the surname include:

 Bernard Roizman (born 1929), American scientist
  (1912–1985), American cutter and film maker
 Owen Roizman (1936–2023), American cinematographer
 Yevgeny Roizman (born 1962), Russian politician
 Zinovy Roizman (1941–2022), Russian film and animation director and screenwriter